San Francisco Nights is a 1928 American silent drama film directed by Roy William Neill and starring Percy Marmont, Mae Busch, and George E. Stone.

Cast
 Percy Marmont as John Vickery 
 Mae Busch as Flo 
 Tom O'Brien as 'Red' 
 George E. Stone as 'Flash' Hoxy 
 Alma Tell as Ruth 
 Hobart Cavanaugh as Tommie

References

Bibliography
 Donald W. McCaffrey & Christopher P. Jacobs. Guide to the Silent Years of American Cinema. Greenwood Publishing, 1999.

External links

1928 films
1928 drama films
Silent American drama films
American silent feature films
1920s English-language films
Films directed by Roy William Neill
American black-and-white films
Gotham Pictures films
1920s American films